Vanished or The Vanished may refer to:

Film and television
Vanished!, a 1971 TV film adaptation of Fletcher Knebel's novel starring Richard Widmark
Vanished (1995 film) or Danielle Steel's Vanished, an American romantic drama TV film
The Vanished (2005 film), an Australian short film
Vanished (2006 film), an American TV film on Lifetime TV featuring A. J. Cook
Vanished (2009 film), a Cambodian thriller
Vanished (2012 film), a short film featuring Scott Elrod
Vanished (2014 film), an American romantic drama film starring Richard Bryant
The Vanished (2018 film), a South Korean psychological thriller
The Vanished (2020 film), an American action thriller
 Vanished (TV series), a 2006 American serial drama TV series
"Vanished", an episode of NCIS (season 2)

Literature
Vanished, a 2009 novel by Joseph Finder
Vanished, a 1968 political novel by Fletcher Knebel
Vanished, a 1988 novel by Mary McGarry Morris
 A Void, 1969 French novel, also translated under the titles A Vanishing and Vanish'd
Vanished, a 1993 novel by Danielle Steel

Music
"Vanished" (Crystal Castles song) (2008)
"Vanished", a 2004 song by Front Line Assembly from Civilization

Other uses
The Vanished (podcast), a podcast hosted by Marissa Jones
The Vanished (Star Trek: The Role Playing Game), a 1983 role-playing game adventure
The Vanished (Marvel Cinematic Universe), a name for victims of the Blip, an event in the Marvel Cinematic Universe

See also
 Vanish (disambiguation)
 Vanishing (disambiguation)